Princess and I is a 2012 Philippine teen television drama starring Kathryn Bernardo, Daniel Padilla, Enrique Gil and Khalil Ramos together with an ensemble cast, it aired on ABS-CBN's Primetime Bida evening block and worldwide on The Filipino Channel. The show aired from April 16, 2012 to February 1, 2013 replacing E-Boy and was replaced by Juan dela Cruz.

Plot

Princess Areeyah "Mikay" Wangchuck (Kathryn Bernardo) grew up with her adoptive family. She is close to her father Dinoy Maghirang (Dominic Ochoa), mother and two sisters. Unbeknownst to all of them, she is the only daughter of King Anand Wangchuck (Albert Martinez) and Queen Isabel Wangchuck (Precious Lara Quigaman) and is the long-lost crown princess of the fictional Kingdom of Yangdon (based on real world Bhutan). As a child, she was brought to the Philippines after Ashi Behati (Gretchen Barretto), a royal and a high ranking influential official who desires to rule Yangdon with her son named Prince Jao (Enrique Gil) tries to kill her and her mother. Behati conspired to kill Queen Isabel and the infant Areeyah by bombing Queen Isabel's convoy off the cliff, but only the Queen was killed. Behati ordered her executive Assistant Yin Hwan Dee (Niña Dolino) to kill the child, but out of conscience she lied to Behati, took the child and placed her under the care of Esmeralda (Sharmaine Suarez), a Filipina who works in Yangdon. Esmeralda returned to the Philippines with the princess, not knowing of her identity.

During one of Esmeralda's trips to the marketplace, a bombing took place and Esmeralda lost the child in the ensuing chaos. The child, wearing a Yangdonese scarf on her back, was found by a man named Dinoy Maghirang. He adopted the child and called her Mikay. She grew up in what has been described as a "very loving family," fully aware of her adopted status. Her existence in the family made her eldest stepsister, Bianca Maghirang (Bianca Casado) grow envious and inconsiderate of Mikay. She bullied Mikay until Bianca is exiled. Only then does she realize and consider Mikay as her sister and they make up. Mikay also meets her eventual best friend Kiko (Khalil Ramos) who harbors a crush on her, and Gino (Daniel Padilla), an arrogant teen who comes from an affluent family. His mother, Alicia (Marina Menipayo), was a former diplomat to Yangdon while his father, Edward Dela Rosa (Jong Cuenco), and his grandfather, Don Julio Dela Rosa (Leo Rialp), are heads of a big corporation.

Winning a trip to Yangdon, Mikay meets Jao, a Yangdonese royalty and crown prince, and the two of them become close as he tours her around without knowing that she is the missing princess. Prince Jao eventually develops an attraction for Mikay.

Upon returning to the Philippines, Mikay faces again a lot of difficulties financially, along with her sister's hatred and her mother's indifference towards her. She then meets Gino, the wealthy and arrogant campus heartthrob after literally colliding with her. They meet again after another unfortunate event when Mikay's hotdog costume catches fire and starts burning. Gino saves her by carrying her into a water fountain. Knowing Mikay is in need of money, he offers her a deal to come to his grandfather's party with him and pretend to be his girlfriend, and he will pay her a huge amount in return. Hesitant at first, Mikay accepts the deal.

Gino gets surprised upon seeing Mikay all made up, implying that he is starting to feel differently towards her but still, he and Mikay always ends up getting into an argument. He introduces Mikay to the family, but they disliked and mistreated her and she ends up leaving the party crying after a brief argument with Gino.

However, it doesn't just stop there. The Mean Girls, including Bianca (Mikay's Sister) who admires Gino gets jealous upon seeing him with Mikay. They start to make her life miserable, and in an effort to help her, Gino tells them that Mikay is his girlfriend which angers Mikay as she thinks it will only make them hate her more.

Things gets complicated as Gino's grandfather decides to take away Mikay's scholarship, making the two agree yet again on another deal which is to ignore each other, and act as if the other does not exist. This deal disheartens Gino.

Later, Jao visits the Philippines with his royal butler Han (Ketchup Eusebio), to return the camera that a girl lost in Yangdon. There, he officially meets Mikay and Gino. And it is revealed that Gino was in fact, Jao's best friend back in Yangdon. Because of spending time with Jao as they are the only people Jao knows, Gino and Mikay reconciles and ends the deal they used to have. Eventually, both Jao and Gino fall in love with Mikay. However, Mikay was rejected by both of the boys' families (Gino, by his father and grandfather, and Jao, by his mother, Ashi Behati.)

Meanwhile, in Yangdon, Ashi Behati learned from her assistant Yin that the princess was alive and follows Jao to the Philippines. Upon her arrival, she found out Jao's connection with Mikay and Behati plotted to get rid of her. Behati also searched for Esmeralda with Yin's help. In Yangdon, King Anand found a suspicious letter with a mark of an eagle, thus from the Eastern Kingdom and from then on, he became suspicious of Ashi Behati and her involvement in the rebellion. King Anand followed Behati to the Philippines with his counselors to investigate. From Jao, King Anand learned that her daughter is still alive and he ordered a search for Esmeralda. When Esmeralda was found, King Anand granted her protective custody until the princess was located. Esmeralda saw Dinoy and recognized him. She deduced that Dinoy was Mikay's adoptive father after the bombing incident. The Yangdonese scarf that she was wearing was the proof of Mikay's true identity as the Yangdonese crown princess.

Dinoy feared that Mikay would be taken away and ignored Esmeralda's conclusions. He planned to move away to hide Mikay's lineage. Behati learned of Mikay and ordered for her to be killed by arson. Mikay and her family escaped the burning house but are left without a home. Anand also gave them protection and lodgings. Anand learned of Mikay's identity and after a series of murder attempts, including Mikay and Gino becoming kidnapped. Gino was beaten by Behati's hired men as he tried to protect Mikay. Gino's mother requested Mikay to stay away from his son, as she thinks Mikay causes her son so much trouble. Mikay bids her farewell to Gino while he was at the hospital pretending to be asleep to hide his tears. Soon after, Mikay, Jao and King Anand leaves for Yangdon. Mikay surprisingly sees Gino at the airport, they bid their goodbyes as they hugged, while Mikay was in tears.

Mikay returned to Yangdon. She was crowned thus gained her birthright to the throne. While adjusting to the royal life, Jao joins Mikay to support her.

Later, Gino followed Mikay despite his mother's objections. As she tours him around Yangdon, they almost immediately cause trouble. People from Yangdon finds out about it through a newspaper that releases an article about "The Princess and her Filipino boyfriend", which causes the citizens to reconsider her role as princess and eventually queen. Behati then reminds the kingdom that the tradition states that the crown princess must marry a Dasho at the age of 18.

To determine which Dasho would marry her, a contest was held between all Dasho of the West. The winner will take princess' hand in marriage. Meanwhile, Gino decided to enter too. At first, he was rejected because he is not a Dasho but after a visit to the King's Library, Gino learned that his mother Alicia had a relationship with Dasho Kencho (Christian Vasquez), thus finding out that his true identity was Dasho Yuan, and that he had an older brother which was Jao. Gino was finally accepted to enter the competition. Ashi Behati does not tell anyone the true identity of Jao. Jao's real father is Priam (Christian Bautista), she was just using Dasho Kencho to play the role of Jao's real father, but it was all a part of her plan to get back the Kingdom of Yangdon. As Jao and Gino competed, they promised that whoever wins, he will free the princess from the law. Jao and Gino reached the finals along with Dasho Kim (Joseph Marco). In the end, Dasho Jao won. His victory proved that he is the next heir of Yangdon and he is loyal, dedicated and that he loves Princess Areeyah. Mikay and Jao continue their engagement, leaving Gino devastated and feeling betrayed (in their agreement, if one of them wins, he would set Mikay free from the law).

Mikay chose not to break off their engagement because she believed that Jao will make a great, just king. After the contest, an outreach program was held by Mikay to help Yangdon's impoverished citizens. Unbeknownst to them, Yin came back to Yangdon to get revenge on Ashi Behati after betraying her. Gino, still feeling devastated, wandered the mountains alone and ended up near Yin's house. Yin gained Gino's trust to get revenge on Ashi Behati. After the outreach program, Mikay collapsed from exhaustion and she was carried to Ashi's room. Mikay stumbled on her jewelry but accidentally saw the Medallion of the East. She was caught by Ashi Behati. At first, Mikay had no clue but after researching, she found out that Ashi Behati and Jao are members of Eastern Kingdom. After she confirmed her suspicions, Mikay was terrified and worried over Jao's well-being if the kingdom had learned about their true heritage. Mikay finally questioned the Kingdom about the policies concerning the East, but the Drukpah did not listen to her petition; their hearts were filled with grudge and hatred towards the rebels of the East Kingdom. With this, Anand told Mikay to think of the royal engagement rather than rebels of the East.

It is the time of the Royal Engagement and everyone was rejoicing, believing that Yangdon would have a good future with Dasho Jao and Princess Areeyah as the next heirs to the throne. But things went into chaos when Gino had brought Yin to the Royal Engagement, as a thank you for helping him when he had fallen in a cliff, and not realizing that Yin had plans of revenge against Ashi Behati. In the middle of the program, Yin accuses Ashi Behati as the person responsible for Queen Isabel's death and having an allegiance towards the rebels of the East, because of this both Yin and Behati were sent to prison, and because of the accusations the King commanded his soldiers to investigate the palace of Behati to find anything that proves that Behati had an allegiance with the rebels. The soldiers didn't find anything, but unbeknownst to Behati who thought she was safe because she buried the medallion, Mikay leads Jao to forest where Behati buried it and Jao eventually found out the truth about his true heritage and becomes terrified. But his discovery doesn't stop him from being a good citizen. Jao decided not to hide the truth and tells the king about their true heritage and pleaded the king for mercy. But the King is enraged when he realizes that Ashi had been the one to murder the Queen and using the Law of Bounding, he sentences both Jao and Behati to death, but Princess Areeyah who was against this Law pleaded with the king to lower their sentence because of Jao's innocence, with this, The King decides to let them live and be thrown to a place called Gulag, a place where they will become laborers and work for Yangdon and will be known as Internal Criminals.

As Behati and Jao are heading towards Gulag, Mikay requested permission from the King to meet Jao at least say goodbye to him. But as Jao was on the way to their meeting place, he gets caught and is beaten half-dead while Behati was shot down and presumed to be dead. As Jao mourned for his mother's death Jao fell unconscious and was helped by Shivaji (Arthur Acuna). Back at the palace Princess Areeyah is still devastated for not being able to see Jao for the last time. She cannot admit but she loves Jao. She does not eat for days and does not sleep due to devastation. So Nagaiel, a friend of Gino's late father Dasho Kencho, tells Gino that he is the only person that the Princess can rely on during her depression. Meanwhile, Jao wakes up from his injuries and he realizes he was taken to the Philippines where he was brought in by one of the citizens of the East Kingdom named Salve (Ces Quesada), Jao also found out that he is in Santol Village, also called "Yangdon of the Philippines", according to him, a place where citizens of the East Kingdom who escaped from Yangdon were living peacefully without any worries of getting caught.

Nearly a month later after Jao and Behati were thrown out, peace was beginning to come back to Yangdon and it is the time for the Drukpah Ministers to choose who will be the Dasho that the Princess should marry. They decide to choose Dasho Yuan(Gino). But concerned for the princess's well-being, he rejects the offer. But during the dispute, Mikay suddenly appears and accepts Gino as her next fiancé so she can become Queen and change the law, allowing innocent people who were sent to the Gulag to come back, including Jao. She also cannot forget about Jao, and is constantly reminded of him, pushing Gino away. Leaving him hurt, but still determined to make the princess happy, even without Jao. Meanwhile, Jao who is starting to recover from his injuries learns that it was Shivaji who had saved him from going to the Gulag. Due to Shivaji's influence, Jao's mind is slowly being poisoned as he slowly feels hatred towards King Anand and Mikay and all the Citizens of the West Kingdom. While in Masantol Village, Jao is starting to earn his own living and decided to live on his own and eventually meets his own kin. One of them is Lara (Akiko Solon), a Santol girl who has a crush on him.

As Mikay is having a hard time forgetting her past, King Anand tasks Gino to do everything for Mikay to make her happy. Gino replies determined that he wouldn't stop till he succeeds in his mission. So, Gino plans, with the King's permission, to give Mikay a chance to spend Christmas with her family in the Philippines. Meanwhile, Alicia and her husband Edward also returns from the United States, with an adopted child named Angelo. As both the Maghirang and Dela Rosa Family are spending Christmas, Alicia decides to bring Gino to the United States to have a new life because she can no longer withstand seeing her son's feelings being crushed every time. But Gino couldn't accept his mother's decision and gets mad at her for interfering with his life. When Mikay and Gino get into a little spat, Gino feels rejected and decides to think about actually going to the US. When Mikay finds out about this, she is devastated. She is afraid to lose the person who has been there for her all the time. And determined to make it up to him, at least before he goes away, she decides to plan him a little surprise. She pretends to steal his shades and have him chase her, thus leading him into a garden which is decorated to look like a hotdog stand; to remind him of the reason where they first became close. She even wears the blue bear suit that Gino wore when they went to Enchanted Kingdom and even sings him his favorite song. Gino is touched and soon forgives Mikay, as she tells him that she doesn't ever want him to think that he is just for rebound. They become close once again and become almost inseparable. But Mikay's sisters, Bianca and Dindi, are worried that Mikay might hurt Gino again, for they can really see the boy's efforts to get to Mikay. Mikay assures to them that she will no longer hurt Gino's feelings and eventually both Mikay and Gino become closer and Mikay is able to smile once again.

After a while, Gino and Mikay hold another outreach program to help the needy people. Gino decides to take a stroll and learns about Santol Village where he meets Salve. He is even surprised when the villagers living there speak the Yangdonese language, and realizes that those people came from Yangdon. With this, he happily tells Mikay all about it and they decide to make an outreach program for them without using the money which belonged to Yangdon since those people were from the East. Unbeknownst to Gino, Jao, who still has a grudge against the West including Mikay and Gino, sees him and gets mad. He tells Salve that they do not need pity from others, but Salve comforts him and tells Jao about what lesson she learned after living in the village. Jao calms down. The next morning while at work, Jao was told to deliver some goods not knowing that the goods he was about to deliver were being delivered to the place where Mikay was staying. Jao eventually sees Mikay but she doesn't see him. Inside the house, while preparing Christmas gifts and for the outreach program, Gino prepares a ring for Mikay and proposes for marriage; making a long speech, asking permission from Mang Dinoy, leaning down on one knee and even singing her a song. Touched by his gesture and efforts, Mikay with tears of joy accepts Gino as her fiancé, But not knowing that Jao was in fact watching from afar and witnesses Gino's proposal. This leaves Jao devastated, and with more hate in his heart. Mikay also assures to her adoptive father Dinoy that she would stand on her word and that she wouldn't regret accepting Gino's proposal.

As the both of them take a little stroll around the house, Gino promises Mikay that they wouldn't keep secrets from each other and eventually shared gifts. As for Jao, he spends a sad Christmas in Santol Village. Later that night, Gino who was excited about the outreach program came to visit the village and ask about the program. But was shocked when he learned that Jao was actually in the village. Because of this he felt afraid that he would ruin Mikay's happy Christmas if he told her about Jao being in the Village, so made clever excuses to prevent Mikay from going to Santol Village. But at the same time Gino felt relieved that Jao was in the village. He was glad his brother was safe. Gino did everything to prevent Mikay from going to the village in fear that she should see Jao there. But that didn't stop Mikay from visiting the village, thus seeing Jao there. As Mikay was happily embracing Jao, he, on the other hand, was not happy and told her to go home. As Mikay heads home she asks Gino why he hid the fact that Jao was in the Village. Gino explained that he didn't want Mikay's happy Christmas to be ruined. Mikay accepted Gino's apology and because of this, Mikay together with her family decided to spend Christmas in the Santol Village to make Jao happy. Mikay gives Jao a flute as her Christmas gift, but Mikay soon realizes that Jao is starting to change. But somehow, she still cares. They get into a fight, and Mikay promises to never come back to the village again. Inside Jao's heart he is happy to see the princess but thinking about what Shivaji told him, and Jao throws away the flute given by Mikay.

The next day Jao learns about a soccer tournament and decides to let the kids of Santol enter the tournament, so he tries to earn money for the kids. Meanwhile, Gino and Mikay try to build a new outreach program, considering they couldn't go into Santol anymore, but they couldn't think of a way. One day, Gino secretly goes to the Santol Village just to make a proper farewell with his brother. He also doesn't tell Mikay about going back to the village because he wants Mikay to move on. But realizing about Jao's current behavior and his hatred, Gino decides to stay, also with the convincing of Aling Salve. Eventually Gino also learns about the soccer tournament and helps the kids to enter and became their team manager.

Meanwhile, Mikay who was suspicious about Gino decides to follow him. While following Gino she stumbled upon a crying kid who was also from Santol Village and a competitor of the soccer tournament. He was crying because his foot was wounded, and she decides to help him. Mikay also met an old man who was known as Amang and helps them. Amang is also the head of Santol Village who was responsible for bringing the citizens of the East kingdom to the Philippines. He also recognizes Mikay as Princess Areeyah and tells her about the fact that they are from the East Kingdom and explained their situation. He begged her to not leave them because he wants their own country to recognize them. Mikay gave her word and promised him that she would definitely fulfill it. Later Mikay sees Gino and learns about the soccer tournament and the fact that Jao is their coach. Mikay eventually accepts Gino's apology and also tells Gino about her conversation with Amang and they promise to each other that they are partners, and that they will stick together. And that even though Jao is in the village, they will help it, as it is their duty as a Dasho and a princess.

As Jao feels irritation towards Mikay and Gino, he gets angry at Gino for buying the kids new slippers, and did everything to get rid of Mikay and Gino. He also refuses the help they offer to him. Jao also talks to Shivaji about the tournament but Shivaji reminded him why did he had brought Jao to the Masantol village, that that nonsense was none of his concern. Left with no choice, Jao accepted Gino's help but his behavior was getting worse. Jao starts to become immodest and imprudent towards Mikay and Gino. And soon Gino finally snaps when he sees Jao mistreating Mikay and punches him right in the face, ensuing a quarrel between the two brothers.

Meanwhile, in an unknown place somewhere in Yangdon, it is revealed that Ashi Behati somehow faked her own death and everything was for Jao to give his trust to the rebels, lying about her death to make him mad at the people of the West. Behati and her followers are already making their plans for taking the West kingdom and make Anand and Areeyah pay for what they did.

At the Maghirang household, Mikay learns about the fact that her father King Anand is scheduled to come at the Philippines. And because of this they devise a plan of how to tell the King about Santol.

Back at the Santol Village, Shivaji visits and asks Jao about making their move, and reminds him of being the next King. He also asks Jao about any trouble he may have been having but Jao did not dare tell Shivaji about Mikay because he is still concerned about her. Later Salve tries to comfort Jao and help him be honest with his own feelings.

Meanwhile, back at the resthouse, Gino and Mikay also realize about Jao's feelings. So Dinoy tells Mikay to not hasten her decisions so she would not hurt both Jao and Gino's feelings. Mikay also decides to not break the promise she made to Amang. So Gino is left with no choice and decides to go along with Mikay, but assures that he wouldn't let Jao hurt Mikay any longer. Mikay only nodding in agreement.

Upon their return to Santol they see Jao telling the villagers that even if Mikay and Gino wouldn't return, they would make their own living and prove that they can do anything. Mikay upon hearing this tells them that they are not the type of people who would give up so easily. She then holds Gino's hand for support. Then Jao who notices this becomes annoyed and pretty much jealous, Which leads to him walking out. With this Mikay and Gino follow him. She tells Jao to be tell them everything that happened to him and to be honest with himself. Jao becomes even more angry. But Mikay tells Jao that they won't stop helping the villagers just for him. That night, Jao becomes enraged at Mikay for not knowing about the incident that happened to his mother. But at the same time, Jao, left with no choice, decides to help them with their project. Both Gino and Mikay happily enjoys themselves with the villagers. Mikay sees Jao and watches him from a distance and walk away. Mikay couldn't easily disregard Jao because he was once close to her too and she hopes there's still kindness left in his heart. Gino, misinterpreting what he saw, felt devastated after he did everything so that Mikay would focus her attention to himself, but to no avail.

Meanwhile, Shivaji goes back to Santol Village and tells Jao that the Eastern Kingdom needs his leadership as their King, and tells him that they should kidnap the Princess so that they can bring Anand down to his knees, for they know that Areeyah is Anand's weakness. But Jao admits that he is not ready to fulfill his duty as their King.

The next day Mikay and Gino continues to help the village, and Jao, who thought about what Shivaji had told him about kidnapping Areeyah, was forced to tell the whole Village about Mikay's true identity as the Princess of Yangdon, to force Mikay to leave the village. Mikay however explained to the villagers her intention of bringing them back to Yangdon but the Eastern Villagers, remembering what Mikay's family did to them, tells Mikay to get lost. Gino however gets angry after learning that it was Jao who told them about Mikay's true identity. Because of this Gino blackmails Mikay into leaving Yangdon with him or else he would tell King Anand about their situation.

Mikay didn't listen to Gino and still went to the Santol Village to prove to them that she believes that the East and West can still be united. But the villagers except Salve, Jao and Amang closed their hearts and stoned Mikay helplessly and she collapses due to her injuries, with Jao only looking at the princess without even helping her. Gino soon comes to her aid, and Salve scolds Jao for not doing anything and allowing the people who cared for him treat her with such cruelty. Jao realizes what he has done and all he wanted was to avoid Mikay getting hurt. As for Mikay, she is taken to the hospital to treat her injuries. Because of the incident, Gino was forced to tell the King about their situation and the King orders Gino to bring the princess back to Yangdon immediately. As Mikay is resting in her hospital room, Jao disguises himself as a nurse to apologize to Mikay. Mikay only half awake, sees Jao but didn't mind him. By the second time she is still half awake, thinking Jao still there she mistakenly calls Gino "Jao" which ended with Gino getting hurt even more.

After Mikay was healed from her injuries, Mikay still wants to continue to convince the Villagers of Santol Village. With this Gino finally snaps and called Mikay a fool for allowing herself to be hurt and the worst thing of all is Jao is the one who is hurting her the most, and wonders if she can love him as a whole person. Mikay is speechless. She doesn't say anything and only sobs when she hears those words. Gino, devastated, walks out of the room and breaks down. He then decides that it was his time to give up. Mikay tries to talk to him, but he only brushes her away. Thus having Mikay break down seeing Gino's coldness towards her. She even talks to Mang Dinoy, saying that it was like she was about to lose him.

The next day, Mikay tries to talk to Gino. But the boy still remains cold towards her and is even thrifty with his words. She tells him that she finally agrees to go with him back to Yangdon, but he doesn't budge. He only agrees then leave her there hanging. Meanwhile, Jao discovers that the Santol kids weren't anymore allowed to play in the tournament. He assumes that the reason for this was the King, since he sees a letter that has the symbol of Yangdon. He stomps into the resthouse where Mikay and Gino are staying, and snaps at them for pulling the kids out of the tournament. Mikay and Gino try to defend themselves, and tell Jao that they did nothing to pull the kids out. But Jao is not convinced, and swears to them that he will bring them down, not knowing that it was his own mother (who he still believes is dead), who really had the kids out of the tournament.

Gino still continues to be cold towards Mikay. He does not even budge whenever Mikay tries to talk to him. He only has a poker face on and only talks to her whenever needed, but still very cold to her. It had seemed the old bad boy Gino was back. Gino is also always out of the house. And he returns always late at night. Mikay continues to try to make up with him, to no avail. Unknown to her, Gino is actually already finding ways to get the kids back in the tournament. He saves his money, and even sells his things just to find money for the kids to play. One night Gino returns in the middle of the night, and finds Mikay asleep on the couch. When she wakes up, he only stares at her, without a single emotion on his face. They get into a spat, and once again Mikay is left hurt.

The story continues and Shivaji invites Jao to the meeting with very important people of the Eastern Kingdom. His mother, Ashi Behati shows up with Dorji, but was hiding, she just wanted to witness what was going on from afar. There he meets Priam, and he reveals to Jao that he is his biological father. For proof, Priam hands Jao a letter that Ashi Behati wrote while she was pregnant with Jao. Ashi married Dasho Kencho so Jao would not be stripped from his title. Ashi Behati did not love Dasho Kencho, she only loved Priam.

One day, Gino calls his mother. He tells her that he would like to stay in America with her and their family. Alicia asks if it would be with Mikay, and Gino slowly replies with a no. Alicia asks him why, and that she was sure Mikay would be hurt when she finds about that he was leaving. He then reveals that he was already acting cold towards her, getting her to be mad at him so that it wouldn't be too hard on her part to say goodbye. Alicia tells Gino to think about it, but it seems Gino's decision was already final.

Jao agreed with Shivaji with the plans in kidnapping Princess Areeyah, so he comes up with a way to get the Princess alone. While setting up for a birthday party, Jao, Gino and Mikay go buy cake. Jao tricks Gino and Mikay and takes them to an empty house, the house to pick up the birthday present, which was a personalized bag and new uniform for football. Thinking Mikay still really loves Jao, Gino keeps pushing Mikay away as he stays away the two. Mikay and Jao gets into a shed because of the heavy rain as Gino insists to stay at the shed outside. There Jao reveals that he still loves Mikay and he hopes she still feels the same way. Mikay reveals that though she once loved Jao, she realizes that throughout everything Gino never gave up on her. She tells him that it hurts her that she and Gino are not in good terms because of what's happening and that she hates seeing Gino getting hurt as well.

Mikay then came to Gino as he continues to push her away from Jao. She tells him everything's different now, because the two of them "happened". This however doesn't satisfy Gino for he feels Mikay really can't love him wholeheartedly. Gino walks away from Mikay as Jao, being heartbroken as well calls Shivaji and tells him what location they are at. Gino overhears Jao's phone call conversation and punches Jao. Gino runs back to get Mikay, so they could find some sort of way to escape. When Jao goes near them, they ask him why is he doing this to them. Mikay says, "why Jao?" While Gino say, "why would you do this to your own brother?" Jao screams out, "you are not my brother, I am a full blood of the Eastern Kingdom."

Mikay and Gino eventually escaped from the raging Jao and left to go back home to Yangdon. As King Anand, Mikay and Gino were having a conversation, Mikay happily tells King Anand about their future plans. She then leaves Gino and Anand for a bit, to change clothes. Gino then told Anand that he only went to Yangdon to send the princess safely back to her father and told the King that he is about to leave and go to America without telling Mikay. Gino leaves and when Mikay found out about it, she was devastated as she tried to chase him. They see each other at the airport and Mikay cries as she asks Gino to stay with her, reminding him of their promise. She reassures him they could start anew for she can't make it without him, not anymore. However, Gino stood firm with his decision and leaves Mikay, although it's against his will as he still loves her so much. Both were in tears as they parted ways.

Yangdon is then turned to chaos by Behati. King Anand is taken prisoner and Mikay had to run and hide even before reaching the palace. Meanwhile, Gino hears of this and immediately goes back to find Mikay. Mikay tries to contact Gino over the phone in the hopes that he still hasn't left. Gino gets the call from Mikay and told her to hide to a safe place as he promised look for her and find her.

He finds Mikay, scared and hiding in the forest and Gino promises to never leave Mikay again. The two spend the evening hiding behind a tree, away from any of the Silangan. In the morning, they are found by Sivaji, their hopes were up because they thought Sivaji was there to save them but they find out that Sivaji is no more than a traitor. Gino tells Mikay to run away as he fights against Sivaji and the guards but Gino gets beaten and taken as hostage in the palace.

Mikay is found by a trusted member of the West and is taken to safety with the rest of the West. Priam is shot dead. Despite Mikay's requests to look for Gino and her father, she is told to stay strong because a lot of her people need help from lack of food and injuries.

As Gino's injuries get worse and is suffering more and more in prison, the members of the Drukpah beg for the guards to help him but in instead Jao comes. Jao gets the guards to take Gino's shirt off.

Mikay travels from city to city in Yangdon offering as much help as she can to her suffering people, Jao travels to one of these cities and tells the people to give something to Mikay. A blood stained white tee shirt, Mikay instantly notices that it is Gino's. She gets worried for him but she still knows that Gino is alive and she broadcasts a worldwide speech about what is currently happening and Yangdon but doesn't ask for anything but prayers, she also speaks out about how she doesn't see a difference between the Kanluran and Silangan and she says that all they need is understanding.

Mikay accepts Jao's proposal in return for Gino and her father's welfare and also for the East and West Kingdoms to be able to finally get together.

Jao and the Silangan guards return the wounded Gino to Mikay, and the West guards take him to their safehouse. Mikay takes care of Gino and helps him recover as she told him how happy she was that her Knight in Shining Armor, as how she refers him, was safe.

Gino and Mikay spend their last night together full of love and happiness and make promises to each other by lighting floating lanterns in the sky. Both imagine the wedding that was supposed to be theirs as they profess how they would still love each other although they would soon have to be apart.

When the day of the wedding comes, Gino is the one that escorts Mikay to Jao, right when Jao has to say his vows he realizes that everything is wrong and calls for the wedding to stop. Behati, enraged gets a gun out and says that Mikay has to die but Gino steps in front of her and when the gun is fired, both Gino and Jao collapse to the ground.

Jao is the one who got shot and Behati goes mad, realizing what she has done. Behati is taken to prison and Jao turns out to be alive as a monk and it is revealed that he is the "I" as he tells his story to children. The West and East get together, fulfilling Mikay's dream, and it is seen that the East Kingdom were welcomed to the palace to meet King Anand and Mikay. Mikay and Gino are now engaged and the people in the palace happily cheers as the two were about to kiss as the show ends .

Cast

Main cast

 

 Kathryn Bernardo as Maria Mikaela "Mikay" Maghirang-Dela Rosa / Princess Areeyah Wangchuck-Rinpoche
 Daniel Padilla as Gerald Antonio "Gino" Dela Rosa / Dasho Yuan Rinpoche
 Enrique Gil as Dasho Jan Alfonso "Jao" Rinpoche
 Khalil Ramos as Martin Nikolas "Kiko" Salamat

Supporting cast
 Albert Martinez as King Anand Wangchuck
 Gretchen Barretto as Ashi Behati Rinpoche
 Dominic Ochoa as Danilo "Dinoy" Maghirang
 Sharmaine Suarez as Esmeralda "Esme" Ortiz
 Niña Dolino as Yin Whan Di
 Karen Timbol as Stella Cruz-Maghirang
 Yayo Aguila as Des Salamat
 Beverly Salviejo as Anna Salamat
 Frances Ignacio as Ellen Salamat
 Marina Benipayo as Alicia de la Rosa
 Jong Cuenco as Edward de la Rosa 
 Shey Bustamante as Vicky Ortiz
 Bianca Casado as Bianca Maghirang 
 Sofia Andres as Dindi Maghirang
 Maxine Misa as Steph
 Roeder Camañag as Ambet
 Allen Dizon as Pratchit

Extended cast
 RS Francisco as Dorji 
 Young JV as Jonas de Ocampo
 DM Sevilla as Romeo
 Nina Ricci Alagao as Drukpah Minister Chumi 
 Arthur Acuna as Drukpah Minister Shivaji
 Jerry O'Hara as Drukpah Minister Bibek 
 Levy Ignacio as Drukpah Minister Razza 
 Jonic Magno as Drukpah Minister Anash 
 Ian Galliguez as Drukpah Minister Noime Capul
 Heidi Arima as Drukpah Minister Karuna
 Mimi Orara as Drukpah Minister Rasha 
 Jojo de Castro as Drukpah Minister Prashan
 Justin Cuyugan as Drukpah Minister Laksam
 Minco Fabregas as Dr. Ramon Santos
 Lynn Oeymo as Bianca's friend
 Kyra Custodio as Bianca's friend
 Auriette Divina as Bianca's friend

Guest cast
 Angeline Quinto as herself
 Jillian Ward as Jecha
 Joseph Marco as Dasho Kim Methra 
 Piero Vergara as Dasho Rio 
 John Manalo as Dasho Pema
 Javy Gil as Dasho Ken Sarivijal
 Yves Flores as Dasho Samdrup 
 Alec Dungo as Dasho Chopel
 Justin Gonzales as Dasho Arden 
 Joe Vargas as Dasho Boochan 
 Bryan Santos as Dasho Randel
 Phytos Ramirez as Dasho Pelden (credited as "Phytos Kyriacou")
 Jaco Benin as Dasho Kinley 
 Simon Ibarra as Nagaiel
 EJ Jallorina as Tom 
 Ces Quesada as Salve
 Akiko Solon as Lara
 Kiray as Janella / Hae Dong-young

Special participation
 Precious Lara Quigaman as Queen Isabel Wangchuck
 Dante Rivero as Former King Maja Raja Wangchuck
 Christian Vasquez as Dasho Kencho Rinpoche
 Christian Bautista as Priam
 Spanky Manikan as King Chen Mo
 Casey Da Silva as Young Mikay Maghirang-Dela Rosa / Princess Areeyah Wangchuck-Rinpoche 
 Russiane Jandris Ilao as Young Gino Dela Rosa / Yuan Rinpoche
 Louise Abuel as Young Jao Rinpoche
 Jelo Echaluce as Young Kiko Salamat
 Belinda Mariano as Young Bianca Maghirang

Production
Princess and I, then coming as working title You're Always in my Heart, was announced during an ABS-CBN trade event as one of the upcoming television series of the network to be shown on primetime. After the success of her previous show Mara Clara, the project was given to teen star Kathryn Bernardo as her counterpart Julia Montes was given the lead role for another show, Walang Hanggan.

On March 31, 2012 on the network's primetime newscast TV Patrol, the show was formally announced as Princess and I and will be shown April 16, taking the timeslot of the concluding television show E-boy. Along with Kathryn, other teen actors to star include her Growing Up onscreen team-up partner Daniel Padilla, Pilipinas Got Talent Season 3 Finalist Khalil Ramos, and Enrique Gil, whom she co-starred with in the movie Way Back Home.

Albert Martinez and Precious Lara Quigaman were announced to be the royal parents of Bernardo's character. Gretchen Barretto also joins the cast after her previously announced project Alta was shelved. Other cast announced include Dominic Ochoa, Yayo Aguila, Niña Dolino, and Sharmaine Suarez. Primetime first-timer Dado Lumibao and My Binondo Girl director Francis Xavier Pasion are hired as directors for the show. Star Television will produce the television series. Star Television is the small-screen production arm of Star Cinema, the biggest film production firm in the Philippines, and the makers of primetime hits such as Pangako Sa 'Yo, Imortal, and Magkaribal.

In an interview, Bernardo said that it was an unforgettable experience to shoot abroad in what is anticipated to be one of ABS-CBN's biggest and grandest teleseryes for 2012. Since the story revolves around a fictional rich kingdom in Asia, costume and prop designers were hired to create authentic but stylized and evidently Bhutanese-influenced costumes that were fit for royalty. Notably also, to make the fictional kingdom seem more authentic, while shooting, actors portraying Yangdonese characters had to learn how to deliver their lines in Dzongkha, the language of the Bhutanese, and they would dub themselves in post editing. The cast and crew also had to fly to Bhutan to shoot scenes for the show. It took them two weeks to finish shooting in Bhutan, and they continued shooting in the Philippines after they arrived. However, in some scenes where there is in need to portray Bhutan, production were made using green screen technology. Bernardo said it has helped her character that she looks like the princess of Bhutan, and that it would help the viewers appreciate the show more.

The full trailer was released on April 2, 2012 via the primetime series Walang Hanggan. Soon after, the trailer became a top trending topic nationwide on Twitter. Two days later, the official poster was released.

International broadcast
: MyTv

Reception

Awards and recognitions

Soundtrack

The Princess and I OST soundtrack was released in three parts under Star Records, led by the show's themesong, Nag-Iisang Bituin by Christian Bautista. The second single, Hinahanap Hanap Kita by Daniel Padilla was released on May 1 followed by the show's third single, Kung Ako Ba Siya by Khalil Ramos on May 3.

See also
List of programs broadcast by ABS-CBN
List of telenovelas of ABS-CBN

References

External links
 
 Princess and I at ABS-CBN Forums

ABS-CBN drama series
2012 Philippine television series debuts
2013 Philippine television series endings
Television series by Star Creatives
Philippine romantic comedy television series
Bhutan in fiction
Filipino-language television shows
Television series about teenagers
Television shows filmed in the Philippines
Television shows filmed in Bhutan